A Fairly Odd Summer (also known as A Fairly Odd Movie 3 or A Fairly Odd Paradise) is a 2014 live-action/animated comedy television film. It is the sequel to A Fairly Odd Christmas and was released on August 2, 2014. It is the third and final installment in The Fairly OddParents live-action film series beginning with the first film A Fairly Odd Movie: Grow Up, Timmy Turner!, and continuing with its first sequel.

The film was released on DVD on October 28, 2014, and was released on Blu-ray on December 4, 2015.

Plot
Following his previous adventure, Timmy Turner is assigned a summer job in Fairy World's Yuck Factory by head fairy, Jorgen Von Strangle, who insists he take responsibility for income as an adult, something his own fairies agree upon. Timmy, despite not being happy he will not be able to enjoy a summer vacation, chooses to do so in order to impress Tootie, who now works for the Help Creatures Dimmsdale Research Center. One day after work, Timmy visits Tootie at the Center and discovers to his dismay that the head of the Center wishes her to deliver a special gas cure for rare spotted dolphins to Hawaii, which will be contained in a vial in the same size and shape as Timmy's lip balm. In mix-up and totally unaware of it, Timmy sets his lip balm down by the gas cure, which is inadvertently packed away into a travel case by mistake while he takes the cure's vial. Later, upon returning home, Timmy is shocked to discover that his parents are also going to Hawaii, after Mr. Turner's pencil company chose it for the company's next vacation. Mr. Turner further reveals that he has been put in charge of providing the entertainment in the form of a fire dance and been given the money to do so, only to learn from Timmy after reading the note his boss gave him in more detail, that he will be fired if he fails to provide. Meanwhile, two children from a rich family, Marty and Mitzy, are excited about going to Hawaii, until they learn their parents will not be going, instead sending them off with a babysitter, who turns out to be Vicky.

In Fairy World, Jorgen promotes Timmy to supervise the source of all fairy magic, Abracadabraium, while he is away in Hawaii competing in the Bronze Biceps contest. Much to his chagrin, Timmy takes on the job, but whilst preparing to have his lunch, Timmy discovers that his father packed the check he had been given within his sandwich by mistake, while also discovering that his lip balm got mistakenly taken by Tootie and not the gas cure. Seeking to avoid both sufferings by these minor accidents, Timmy decides to head to Hawaii, taking the Abracadabraium with him in a bowling bag. Meanwhile, Poof's counterpart, Foop, who had been spying on him, meets with the Anti-Fairy council over his failure to destroy Timmy's fairies and vows to find a new way to do so by going after the Abracadabraium and destroying it, despite the fact that no anti-fairy can touch it because of the good magic stored in it. The council orders him to do so, stripping him of his bottle, the source of his magic, to ensure he completes his task in order to avoid a horrible punishment. Heading for Hawaii, Foop runs into Mr. Crocker at the airport, after he was sent there by his mother in the hopes of curing his obsession with fairies. Realizing that Foop plans to cause mischief for Timmy and destroy Fairy World, Crocker agrees to help him in acquiring the Abracadabraium.

After returning the check to his father and giving back the gas cure to Tootie to save both their jobs, Timmy decides to relax with her and his fairies on the beach. While doing so, he and Tootie run into Marty and Mitzy, who had run away from Vicky after she had mistreated them on their vacation and help them escape from her so that they can have some fun. But while relaxing, Crocker, who is given the money for the fire dance by Mr. Turner, and Foop, having taken on human form, successfully distract the pair and steal the bag carrying the Abracadabraium from Timmy, soon putting Fairy World in danger, and weakening Cosmo, Wanda and Poof. Realizing he has been duped, Timmy is soon spotted by Jorgen who becomes furious he lost the Abracadaraium; his anger changes his skin, causing him to lose in the Bronze Biceps contest. Seeking to get the Abracadabrium back, the pair and the fairies recruit Marty and Mitzy to help and soon discover that Foop plans to drop it into a lava pool within a volcano. Arriving to stop him, the group discovers that Crocker, who was planning to drop it, became affected by it, turning good and refusing to do as Foop wants. Angered, Foop risks touching the substance to destroy it, leading to Timmy struggling with him to get it back and falling into the lava with it. Much to the surprise of the others, Timmy survives and becomes a fairy (his appearance that of his cartoon self in his youth without the buck teeth) after absorbing some of the powers of the Abracadabraium. A defiant Foop swears revenge but is soon sent away by Poof, while Crocker soon returns to his normal self.

With Timmy now a fairy, Jorgen reassigns Cosmo, Wanda and Poof to Marty and Mitzy, who he states deserve them, all while leaving them close by for Timmy to see them. Timmy soon uses his fairy powers to save his father's job by creating a fire dance for him with Crocker in it, after learning he took the money for it. While Marty and Mitzy take delight in having fairies, turning Vicky into a rabbit, Tootie declares she will need time to get used to Timmy as a fairy, before dancing with him. The stage sets off fireworks and Poof sends off the audience with an "Aloha!".

In the epilogue, Foop gets sent down the drain, which he describes as the "unspeakable horror".

Cast

Live actors

 Drake Bell as Timmy Turner
 Daniella Monet as Tootie
 Daran Norris as Mr. Turner
 Teryl Rothery as Mrs. Turner 
 David Lewis as Mr. Denzel Crocker
 Mark Gibbon as Jorgen Von Strangle
 Devon Weigel as Vicky
 Carter Hastings as Marty
 Ella Anderson as Mitzy
 Ali Liebert as Mrs. Mulligan
 Vincent Tong as Dr. Flemmish
 Scott Baio as Foop
 Butch Hartman as Crazy Guy

Animated voice cast

 Daran Norris as Cosmo (voice)
 Susanne Blakeslee as Wanda (voice)
 Tara Strong as Timmy Turner (reprising role from The Fairly OddParents), Poof (voice)
 Eric Bauza as Foop (voice)
 Veena Sood as Anti-Fairy Councilman (voice)

Ratings 
The film received 2.79 million viewers and a 0.5 on the 18-49 rating.

References

External links

 

The Fairly OddParents films
2014 television films
2014 films
American children's comedy films
American fantasy comedy films
Canadian fantasy films
Canadian comedy television films
Films directed by Savage Steve Holland
Films set in Hawaii
Films shot in Vancouver
American films with live action and animation
Live-action films based on animated series
Nickelodeon original films
Television sequel films
Films with screenplays by Savage Steve Holland
Films scored by Guy Moon
American comedy television films
Films about vacationing
2010s English-language films
2010s American films
2010s Canadian films